James Anthony Horne (born April 1946) is a British sleep neuroscientist and emeritus professor of psychophysiology at Loughborough University. He is a regular commentator in the British media on the subject of sleep.

References

External links 
Personal website

1946 births
Living people
People educated at Wallington County Grammar School
Academics of Loughborough University
British neuroscientists
Sleep researchers
People associated with The Institute for Cultural Research
British physiologists